Wolverhampton is a city, metropolitan borough and administrative centre in the West Midlands, England. The population size has increased by 5.7%, from around 249,500 in 2011 to 263,700 in 2021. People from the city are called "Wulfrunians".

Formerly governed under Staffordshire, the city grew initially as a market town specialising in the wool trade. In the Industrial Revolution, it became a major centre for coal mining, steel production, lock making, and the manufacture of cars and motorcycles. The economy of the city is still based on engineering, including a large aerospace industry, as well as the service sector.

Toponym
The city is named after Wulfrun, who founded the town in 985, from the Anglo-Saxon Wulfrūnehēantūn ("Wulfrūn's high or principal enclosure or farm"). Before the Norman Conquest, the area's name appears only as variants of Heantune or Hamtun, the prefix Wulfrun or similar appearing in 1070 and thereafter. Alternatively, the city may have earned its original name from Wulfereēantūn ("Wulfhere's high or principal enclosure or farm") after the Mercian King, who according to tradition established an abbey in 659, though no evidence of an abbey has been found. The variation Wolveren Hampton is seen in medieval records, e.g. in 1381.

History
A local tradition states that King Wulfhere of Mercia founded an abbey of St Mary at Wolverhampton in 659.

Wolverhampton is recorded as being the site of a decisive battle between the unified Mercian Angles and West Saxons against the raiding Danes in 910, although sources are unclear as to whether the battle itself took place in Wednesfield or Tettenhall, although those places were not within Wolverhampton's boundaries at the time. The Mercians and West Saxons claimed a decisive victory, and the field of Woden is recognised by numerous place names in Wednesfield.

In 985, King Ethelred the Unready granted lands at a place referred to as Heantun to Lady Wulfrun by royal charter, and hence founding the settlement.

In 994, a monastery was consecrated in Wolverhampton for which Wulfrun granted land at Upper Arley in Worcestershire, Bilston, Willenhall, Wednesfield, Pelsall, Ogley Hay near Brownhills, Hilton near Wall, Hatherton, Kinvaston, Hilton near Wolverhampton, and Featherstone. This became the site for the current St. Peter's Church. A statue of Lady Wulfrun, sculpted by Sir Charles Wheeler, can be seen on the stairs outside the church.

Wolverhampton is recorded in the Domesday Book in 1086 as being in the Hundred of Seisdon and the county of Staffordshire. The lords of the manor are listed as the canons of St Mary (the church's dedication was changed to St Peter after this date), with the tenant-in-chief being Samson, William the Conqueror's personal chaplain. Wolverhampton at this date is a large settlement of fifty households.

In 1179, there is mention of a market held in the town, and in 1204 it had come to the attention of King John that the town did not possess a Royal Charter for holding a market. This charter for a weekly market held on a Wednesday was eventually granted on 4 February 1258 by Henry III.

It is held that in the 14th and 15th centuries that Wolverhampton was one of the "staple towns" of the woollen trade, which today can be seen by the inclusion of a woolpack on the city's coat of arms, and by the many small streets, especially in the city centre, called "Fold" (examples being Blossom's Fold, Farmers Fold, Townwell Fold and Victoria Fold), as well as Woolpack Street and Woolpack Alley.

In 1512, Sir Stephen Jenyns, a former Lord Mayor of London and a twice Master of the Worshipful Company of Merchant Taylors, who was born in the city, founded Wolverhampton Grammar School, one of the oldest active schools in Britain.

From the 16th century onwards, Wolverhampton became home to a number of metal industries including lock and key making and iron and brass working.

Wolverhampton suffered two Great Fires: the first in April 1590, and the second in September 1696. Both fires started in today's Salop Street. The first fire lasted for five days and left nearly 700 people homeless, whilst the second destroyed 60 homes in the first five hours. This second fire led to the purchase of the first fire engine within the city in September 1703.

On 27 January 1606, two farmers, Thomas Smart and John Holyhead of Rowley Regis, were executed on High Green, now Queen Square, for sheltering two of the Gunpowder Plotters, Robert Wintour and Stephen Littleton, who had fled to the Midlands. The pair played no part in the original plot nevertheless suffered a traitor's death of being hanged, drawn and quartered on butcher's blocks set up in the square a few days before the execution of Guy Fawkes and several other plotters in London.

There is also evidence that Wolverhampton may have been the location of the first working Newcomen Steam Engine in 1712.

19th century

A few years before she began her reign, Queen Victoria visited Wolverhampton in the 1830s and described it as "a large and dirty town" but one which received her "with great friendliness and pleasure". In Victorian times, Wolverhampton grew to be a wealthy town mainly due to the huge amount of industry that occurred as a result of the abundance of coal and iron deposits in the area. The remains of this wealth can be seen in local houses such as Wightwick Manor and The Mount (both built for the prominent varnish and paint manufacturers, the Mander family) as well as Tettenhall Towers. All three are located in the western fringe of Wolverhampton, in the areas known as Wightwick and Tettenhall. Many other houses of similar stature were demolished in the 1960s and 1970s.

Wolverhampton gained its first parliamentary representation as part of the Reform Act 1832, when it was one of 22 large towns that were allocated two members of parliament. A local mob attacking electors who voted or intended to vote for the Tory candidate led to the 1835 Wolverhampton riot, with dragoons being called in to end the intimidation. Wolverhampton was incorporated as a municipal borough on 15 March 1848 under the Municipal Corporations Act 1835 before becoming a county borough in 1889. It was represented politically in Victorian times by Charles Pelham Villiers, a Liberal MP and noted free trade supporter who was also the longest-serving MP in parliamentary history. Lord Wolverhampton, Henry Hartley Fowler was MP for Wolverhampton at the turn of the century.

The railways reached Wolverhampton in 1837, with the first station located at Wednesfield Heath, now Heath Town, on the Grand Junction Railway. This station was demolished in 1965, but the area exists as a nature reserve just off Powell Street. Wolverhampton railway works was established in 1849 for the Shrewsbury and Birmingham Railway and became the Northern Division workshop of the Great Western Railway in 1854.

In the 19th century, the city saw much immigration from Wales and Ireland, the latter following the Great Famine. In 1866, a statue was erected in memory of Prince Albert the Prince Consort, the unveiling of which brought Queen Victoria back to Wolverhampton. The unveiling of the statue was the first public appearance Queen Victoria made after the funeral of her husband. A  archway made of coal was constructed for the visit. The Queen was so pleased with the statue that she knighted Wolverhampton's mayor at the time, an industrialist named John Morris. Market Square, originally named High Green, was renamed Queen Square in honour of the visit. The statue replaced a Russian cannon captured during the Siege of Sevastopol in 1855, and remains standing in Queen Square. The statue is known locally as "The Man on the Horse".

The Stafford Street drill hall was completed in 1890.

20th century
Wolverhampton had a prolific bicycle industry from 1868 to 1975, during which time a total of more than 200 bicycle manufacturing companies existed there, but today none exist at all. These manufacturers included Viking, Marston, Sunbeam, Star, Wulfruna and Rudge. The last volume manufacturers of bicycles left Wolverhampton during the 1960s and 1970s – the largest and best-known of which was Viking Cycles Ltd, whose team dominated the UK racing scene in the 1950s (Viking's production of hand-built lightweight racing and juvenile bicycles exceeded 20,000 units in 1965). Closures of other smaller cycle makers followed during the 1980s including such well-known hand-builders as Percy Stallard (the former professional cyclist) and Jack Hateley.

Wolverhampton High Level station (the current main railway station) opened in 1852, but the original station was demolished in 1965 and then rebuilt. Wolverhampton Low Level station opened on the Great Western Railway in 1855. The site of the Low Level station, which closed to passengers in 1972 and completely in 1981, has since been redeveloped with much of the original station incorporated into a hotel.  An Aldi store opened nearby in 2019.

In 1918, David Lloyd George, the British Prime Minister, announced he was calling a General Election at "The Mount" in Tettenhall Wood. Lloyd George also made his "Homes fit for heroes" speech at Wolverhampton Grand Theatre in the same year. It was on the idea of "Homes fit for heroes" that Lloyd George was to fight the 1918 "Coupon" General Election.

Mass council housing development in Wolverhampton, to rehouse families from slum housing, began after the end of the World War I, with new estates at Parkfields (near the border with Coseley) and Birches Barn (near Bantock Park in the west of Wolverhampton) being built, giving the city some 550 new council houses by 1923, although this was a fraction of the number of new council houses required. The first large council housing development in Wolverhampton was the Low Hill estate to the north-east of the city, which consisted of more than 2,000 new council houses by 1927 and was one of the largest housing estates in Britain at the time. Mass council housing development in Wolverhampton continued into the 1930s, mostly in the north of the city in the Oxley and Wobaston areas and on the new Scotlands Estate in the north-east. However, council house building halted in 1940 following the outbreak of World War II in September the previous year.

Wolverhampton St George's (in the city centre) is now the northern terminus for the West Midlands Metro light rail system. An extension to the railway station is due to open in 2022, the opening being delayed until the new railway station is completed. Wolverhampton was one of the few towns to operate surface contact trams and the only town to use the Lorain Surface Contact System. Trolleybuses appeared in 1923, and in 1930 for a brief period the Wolverhampton trolleybus system was the world's largest trolleybus system. The last Wolverhampton trolleybus ran in 1967, just as the railway line through the High Level station was converted to electric operation.

England's first automatic traffic lights could be seen in Princes Square in 1927. The modern traffic lights at this location have the traditional striped poles to commemorate this fact. Princes Square was also the location of the United Kingdom's first pedestrian safety barriers, which were erected in 1934. On 2 November 1927, the A4123 New Road was opened by the then-Prince of Wales (later Edward VIII) linking the city with Birmingham. The New Road was designed as an unemployment relief project and was the United Kingdom's first purpose-built intercity highway of the twentieth century.

Sir Geoffrey Le Mesurier Mander, a member of the Mander family, was Liberal MP for Wolverhampton East from 1929 to 1945, distinguished for his stance against appeasement and as a supporter of the League of Nations. He was known as "the last of the Midland radicals". More recent members have included the Conservative mavericks Enoch Powell and Nicholas Budgen. Powell was a member of Edward Heath's Tory shadow cabinet from 1964, until he was dismissed in April 1968 following his controversial Rivers of Blood speech in which he warned of massive civil unrest if mass immigration of black and Asian commonwealth inhabitants continued. At the same period, Sikh bus drivers and conductors were demonstrating in Wolverhampton against the Transportation Committee's regulations requiring uniform caps and thus prohibiting turbans. In 2005, former Bilston councillor and MP for Wolverhampton South East, Dennis Turner entered the House of Lords as Lord Bilston.

After the end of World War II in 1945, the council erected 400 prefabricated bungalows across Wolverhampton, and built its first permanent postwar houses at the Underhill Estate near Bushbury in the late 1940s. The 1950s saw many new houses and flats built across Wolverhampton as the rehousing programme from the slums continued, as well as the local council agreeing deals with neighbouring authorities Wednesfield Urban District and Seisdon Rural District which saw families relocated to new estates in those areas. The 1960s saw the rehousing programme continue, with multi-storey blocks being built on a large scale across Wolverhampton at locations including Blakenhall, Whitmore Reans and Chetton Green. The later part of the decade saw the Heath Town district almost completely redeveloped with multi-story flats and maisonette blocks. By 1975, by which time Wolverhampton had also taken in the majority of the Borough of Bilston, the Urban Districts of Wednesfield and Tettenhall and parts of Willenhall, Sedgley and Coseley, almost a third of Wolverhampton's population lived in council housing, but since that date social housing has been built on a minimal scale in the area, and some of the 1919–1975 developments have since been demolished.

As well as the many new council estates which sprang up around Wolverhampton during the 20th century, several older parts of the town were redeveloped for new council housing during the 1960s and early 1970s. The most notable example is the Heath Town area, where almost all of the 19th century buildings were demolished during the 1960s and replaced by four tower blocks and several blocks of maisonettes. However, the state housing at Heath Town quickly became unpopular and by the 1980s the area was plagued with crime and unemployment. The first regeneration projects on the estate began during the 1990s, and in 2017 some of the maisonette blocks were demolished. A similar redevelopment took place around the same time in Blakenhall, where new shops and five tower blocks were built in a 1960s redevelopment area. However, all of these buildings were demolished between 2002 and 2011 and have since been replaced with new private and social housing.

Large numbers of black and Asian immigrants settled in Wolverhampton in the 1940s, 1950s and 1960s, mostly settling in the Blakenhall, All Saints, Whitmore Reans and Heath Town areas. Wolverhampton is home to a large proportion of the Sikh community, who settled there during the period (1935–1975) from the Indian state of Punjab. Today, the Sikh community in Wolverhampton is roughly 9.1% of the city's population.

In 1974, as a result of local government reorganisation, Wolverhampton became a metropolitan borough, transferring from Staffordshire into the newly formed West Midlands county. Wolverhampton was granted city status on 31 January 2001 – an honour that had been unsuccessfully applied for in 1953, 1966, 1977, 1985 and 1992  –  making it one of three "Millennium Cities". Wolverhampton also made an unsuccessful application for a Lord Mayor in 2002.

Many of the city centre's buildings date from the early 20th century and before, the oldest buildings being St Peter's Church (which was built in the 13th century but has been largely extended and refurbished since the 15th century, situated on Lichfield Street) and a framed timber 17th-century building on Victoria Street which is now one of just two remaining in the area which was heavily populated by them until the turn of the 20th century. This building was originally a residential property, but later became the Hand Inn public house. It was completely restored in 1981 after a two-year refurbishment project and has been used by various businesses since then including as a second-hand book shop.

On 23 November 1981, an F1/T2 tornado touched down in Fordhouses to the north of Wolverhampton, and later moved over Wolverhampton city centre and surrounding suburbs, causing some damage.

The Wolverhampton Ring Road circumnavigates the city centre linking the majority of the city's radial routes. It was constructed in sections between 1960 and 1986, and carries the number A4150, although this is only marked on one road sign.

The centre of Wolverhampton has been altered radically since the mid-1960s, with the Mander Centre (plans for which were unveiled on 15 April 1965) being opened in two phases, the first in 1968 and the second in 1971. Several refurbishments have taken place since. The Wulfrun Centre, an open shopping area, was opened alongside the Mander Centre's first phase in 1968, but has been undercover since a roof was added in the late 1990s.

Central Wolverhampton police station was built just south of the city centre on Birmingham Road during the 1960s, but operations there were cut back in the early 1990s when a new larger police station was built on Bilston Street on land which became vacant a decade earlier on the demolition of a factory. This was officially opened by Diana, Princess of Wales, on 31 July 1992.

The city centre had several cinemas during the 20th century. The last of these was the ABC Cinema (formerly the Savoy), which closed in 1991 after 54 years. It was then converted into a nightclub, with part of the site being converted into the offices of a recruitment agency in 2005. The building was demolished in 2019 to make way for an extension to the City of Wolverhampton College's Metro One campus.

A modern landmark in the city centre is the Wolverhampton Combined Court Centre on Pipers Row, which opened in 1990 as the town's first purpose-built crown court.

21st century

A few department store chains including Marks & Spencer and Next have stores in the centre of Wolverhampton. Beatties, a House of Fraser store, was announced to close in 2019. Debenhams opened a 3-floor department store in the Mander Centre in 2017, but has now closed. Rackhams had a store on Snow Hill for some 25 years until 1992. This building was then divided between a Netto supermarket and the local archives service, but by 2006 its future was under threat as part of the proposed Summer Row retail development. This led to the closure of the Netto supermarket in June 2007 and the relocation of the archives service to the Molineux Hotel building in 2008. The building has since been demolished toward a development push from the Local Authority at various sites around the city.  The site is now home to a relocated outdoor market.

Following the closure of the Mander Centre branch of Tesco and relocation of Sainsbury's, the only remaining supermarket in the central shopping area is Iceland.  Outside the Ring Road were major branches of Sainsbury's, Asda and Waitrose. The Waitrose store, originally a branch of Safeway which Morrisons were forced to sell off as part of the acquisition of the supermarket chain, closed at the end of trading on 31 December 2020. The store was sold to Tesco which opened in June 2021. Aldi have two stores close to the city centre: one just off the A4123 Birmingham Road and a newer branch close to the former Wolverhampton Low Level railway station in Sun Street.

In 2021, a blue plaque was erected in memory of British immigrant rights activist Paulette Wilson, a member of the Windrush generation. The plaque was launched with campaigners including Patrick Vernon and Claire Darke at the Wolverhampton Heritage Centre. The Centre is a cornerstone of the area's local Caribbean community and was formerly the constituency office of Enoch Powell where the infamous Rivers of Blood speech was written.

Department for Levelling Up, Housing and Communities
On 20 February 2021, it was announced as part of the government's levelling up strategy, that what is now the Department for Levelling Up, Housing and Communities would be the first government department to have a headquarters based outside of London. Five hundred posts, including those of senior civil servants, will be moving to Wolverhampton by 2025.

On 23 February 2021, the then Secretary of State, Robert Jenrick, announced he was hopeful that staff would be working in Wolverhampton by the summer of 2021. He also announced that they were considering building a new office development in or around the city centre to house the new headquarters. The Prime Minister, Boris Johnson, suggested it should be within walking distance of local newspaper Express & Star, where he previously did work experience.

As DLUHC looks set to relocate some 500 members of staff to Wolverhampton, Robert Jenrick officially opened its new Wolverhampton offices at  the recently completed i9 office development on 10 September 2021. At the opening of the new office development the Secretary of State was joined by the leader of City of Wolverhampton Council Ian Brookfield and the West Midlands Mayor, Andy Street.

Art and culture

From the 18th century, Wolverhampton was well known for production of japanned ware and steel jewellery. The renowned 18th- and 19th-century artists Joseph Barney (1753–1832), Edward Bird (1772–1819), and George Wallis (1811–1891) were all born in Wolverhampton and initially trained as japanned ware painters.

The School of Practical Art was opened in the 1850s and eventually became a close associate of the Art Gallery. Among its students and teachers were Robert Jackson Emerson (1878–1944), Sir Charles Wheeler (Emerson's most famous pupil and the sculptor of the fountains in Trafalgar Square), Sara Page who established her studio in Paris, and many other artists and sculptors recognised locally and nationally.

Wolverhampton Art Gallery was established in 1884, whilst Wolverhampton Grand Theatre was opened in 1894.

There is a Creative Industries Quarter in Wolverhampton, just off Broad Street, with facilities ranging from the newly opened Slade Rooms, to the art house cinema the Light House Media Centre and the Arena Theatre, which is part of the University of Wolverhampton.

Wolverhampton has a strong history in the ornate cast iron safe painting industry from the Victorian era. Numerous companies, such as Chubb Lock and Safe Company, hired, taught and expanded their artistic status to international reputation, whereby a safe became truly a work of art with fine script and hand-painted designs, highly collectible today. Even in the United States, one can find their preserved masterpieces to this day. The building was converted into a National Historic Registered Landmark Treasure in 1992, which now houses a cinema, art galleries, nightclub, business offices and a large stained glass rotunda in its foyer. It is among the few canal street factories so well known in the "Black Country" that has been preserved.

Wolverhampton's biggest public art display took place between July and September 2017; Wolves in Wolves saw the installation of 30 wolf sculptures in the city centre and West Park, with the sculptures auctioned off to raise money for charity.

Exhibitions
As its wealth and influence grew, Wolverhampton both took part in notable exhibitions and hosted them. The Great Exhibition of 1851, at The Crystal Palace, had examples of locks, japanned ware, enamel ware and papier-mâché products all manufactured in Wolverhampton.

Following successful exhibitions at Mechanics' Institutes in Manchester and many northern towns, Wolverhampton held an exhibition that was the brain child of George Wallis, an artist employed by the firm of Ryton and Walton. The exhibition was held in the Mechanics' Institute in Queen Street and showed fine art, furniture, and decorated trays, as well as a variety of ironwork, locks and steel toys.

On 11 May 1869 The Earl Granville opened the Exhibition of Staffordshire Arts and Industry in a temporary building in the grounds of Molineux House.

The largest and most ambitious exhibition was the Arts and Industrial Exhibition which took place in 1902. Although housing only one international pavilion, from Canada, the scope and scale of the exhibition mirrored all the advances in other exhibitions of its time. The exhibition site featured several halls housing machinery, industrial products, a concert hall, two bandstands, a restaurant, and a fun fair with thrill rides and a water chute. Its opening, by the Duke of Connaught, was received with hopeful enthusiasm, unfortunately not matched by the weather, which contributed to a £30,000 loss, equivalent to nearly £2M at today's value.

Geography
Wolverhampton lies northwest of its larger near-neighbour Birmingham, and forms the second largest part of the West Midlands conurbation. To the north and west lies the Staffordshire and Shropshire countryside.

Wolverhampton city centre falls outside of the area traditionally known as the Black Country, although some areas such as the town and former borough of Bilston and Heath Town and the Willenhall side of Wolverhampton fall within the Black Country coalfields, leading to confusion as to whether the entire city falls within the region. Modern usage has tended towards using the term to refer to the western part of the West Midlands county, excluding Birmingham, Solihull and Coventry. Examples would be UK Government regional bodies such as the Black Country Development Corporation, under whose remit the city fell.

The city lies upon the Midlands Plateau at 163 m (535 ft) above sea level. There are no major rivers within the city, although the River Penk and River Tame (tributaries of the River Trent) rise in the city, as does Smestow Brook, a tributary of the River Stour, and thence the River Severn. This means that the city lies astride the main east–west watershed of England.

The geology of the city is complex, with a combination of Triassic and Carboniferous geology; specifically Bunter and Keuper sandstone, and Upper and Middle Coal measures. There is also an area of dolerite intrusions.

Climate

Areas of the city

As with much of the locality, the majority of areas in Wolverhampton have names that are of Old English (Anglo-Saxon) origin, with a few exceptions such as Penn (pre-English Brittonic place name) and Parkfields, Park Village, Lanesfield etc. (modern place names of the last couple of hundred years).

Localities in the City of Wolverhampton include:

Aldersley
All Saints
Ashmore Park†
Bilston †
Blakenhall
Bradley†
Bradmore
Bushbury
Castlecroft
Chapel Ash
Claregate
Compton
Coseley †
Dunstall Hill
East Park
Essington ††
Ettingshall†
Fallings Park
Finchfield
Fordhouses
Goldthorn Park†
Gorsebrook
Graiseley
Heath Town
Horseley Fields
Lanesfield†
Low Hill
Lower Penn ††
Merridale
Merry Hill
Monmore Green
Newbridge
Old Fallings
Oxley
Parkfields
Park Village
Pendeford
Penn
Penn Fields
Perton ††
Portobello†
Scotlands Estate
Sedgley †
Stow Heath
Tettenhall†
Tettenhall Wood†
Warstones
Wednesfield †
Whitmore Reans
Wightwick†
Willenhall †
Wood End†
Woodcross†

 Notes †–Partial Municipal Boroughs or Urban Districts added to Wolverhampton County Borough in 1966 and communities within these. These Urban Districts were split between Wolverhampton and other local authorities. Those parts within the present City of Wolverhampton local council area are considered by the ONS to be part of the Wolverhampton Urban sub-division.
††–Areas within the Wolverhampton Urban Sub-division but administered by South Staffordshire District Council.

Nearby places

Cities

Birmingham
Coventry
Hereford
Lichfield
Stoke-on-Trent
Worcester

Towns

Bewdley
Brewood
Bridgnorth
Cannock
Dudley
Halesowen
Kidderminster
Kingswinford
Newport
Rugeley
Sedgley
Shifnal
Shrewsbury
Solihull
Stafford
Stone
Stourbridge
Tamworth
Telford
Tipton
Walsall
Wednesbury
West Bromwich

Villages

Albrighton
Bilbrook
Bobbington
Cheslyn Hay
Codsall
Coven
Essington
Featherstone
Great Wyrley
Himley
Huntington
Lower Penn
Pattingham
Penkridge
Perton
Seisdon
Shareshill
Swindon
Tong
Trysull
Weston-under-Lizard
Wheaton Aston
Wombourne

Green belt 

Wolverhampton has green belt within its boundary, as a part of the wider West Midlands Green Belt. This is scattered around the western half of the city, in the form of green wedges, due to it being highly urbanised. The green belt is in place to prevent further urban sprawl, and preserve greenfield areas. Areas covered include:

Moseley Parklands
Land by Grassy Lane at Wood Hayes
Ashmore Park
Goldthorn/Lower Penn Green
Holy Trinity Church, Ettingshall Park
The Grange, Wergs
Beacon Hill Cemetery
Land south of Pattingham
Aldersley School
Perton Road/Boundary Farm
South Staffs Golf Course
Highfields School
Pennwood Lane
Smestow Valley/Valley Park
Goldthorn/Lower Penn Green

Government
The vast majority of Wolverhampton is governed locally by City of Wolverhampton Council, although some smaller parts of the urban area are governed by South Staffordshire District Council.

The area administered by the City Council is represented in the national United Kingdom parliament by three MPs representing Wolverhampton South West, Wolverhampton South East and Wolverhampton North East constituencies, with the areas administered by South Staffordshire District Council being represented by South Staffordshire constituency. The entire city was part of the West Midlands constituency of the European Parliament.

City of Wolverhampton Council

The City of Wolverhampton is a metropolitan borough, meaning that its City Council is effectively a unitary authority, and therefore is single-tier and provides all services to the district that a borough and county council would together. South Staffordshire District Council is a two-tier authority, with some services provided by Staffordshire County Council.
The council offices are in the Wolverhampton Civic Centre, which is located in St Peter's Square in the city centre. The city council's motto is 'Out of darkness cometh light'.

The Labour Party currently control the council and have been in majority on the council since 1974, with the exceptions of 1978–1979, 1987, 1992–1994 and 2008–2010. The Labour party won 18 out of 20 council seats that were up for election in 2016.Labour Councillor Claire Darke was the Mayor of Wolverhampton for 2019–21.

Civic history

Wolverhampton gained the beginnings of modern local government in 1777, when the Wolverhampton Improvement Act was passed by Parliament. This allowed for the establishment of 125 Town Commissioners who undertook a variety of local improvement work such as punishing bear baiting, improving drainage, widening streets and by the end of the century street lighting had been provided at every street corner and over the doorway of every inn, and water supply had been improved by the sinking of ten new wells and the provision of a great water tank in the market place. Policing had been improved with the appointment of ten watchmen and attempts were also made to regulate the markets and inspect hazardous food.

Wolverhampton parliamentary borough was created by the Reform Act 1832, which included areas currently located with the Metropolitan Boroughs of Dudley, Walsall and Sandwell such as Wren's Nest, New Invention and Sedgley. It was one of 22 large towns that returned two members of parliament.  Under the Redistribution of Seats Act 1885, the original borough was replaced by three new single-member constituencies: Wolverhampton East, Wolverhampton South and Wolverhampton West.

In 1837, Wolverhampton Borough Police was formed. It was disestablished in 1966, and the larger West Midlands Constabulary, which covered not only Wolverhampton but the County Boroughs of Walsall, Dudley, West Bromwich and Warley took over its duties and was headquartered in the city. This force was then replaced in 1974 with the West Midlands Police.

Wolverhampton was incorporated as a municipal borough in 1848 under the Municipal Corporations Act 1835. and the first meeting of the Council took place on 22 May 1848. The town was then made a County Borough in 1889 under the Local Government Act 1888.

In 1933, the boundaries of the borough expanded, taking in areas from Cannock Rural District and Seisdon Rural District, with very little of the surrounding urban area being affected, with only Heath Town Urban District being abolished.

The bulk of the urban districts of Bilston (a borough itself after 1933), Tettenhall and Wednesfield were added to the borough in 1966, along with the northern section of the urban district of Coseley and parts from the north of Sedgley and the west of Willenhall.  The vast majority of these areas were traditionally part of the Parish of Wolverhampton, and were part of the original Parliamentary Borough.

Wolverhampton was one of only two County Boroughs (the other being Liverpool) to have no changes made to the boundary during the 1974 reorganisation of local government, the borough already having a population larger than the 250,000 required for education authorities. This contrasted with both the Redcliffe-Maud Report, and the initial White Paper for the 1974 reforms where large areas of the present South Staffordshire district were to be added to the borough. During the 1974 reforms it was placed within the West Midlands Metropolitan County.

Wolverhampton was also a Royal Peculiar covering a large area.

Honorary Aldermen
The Local Government Act 1972 (Section 249) provides for appointment of Honorary Aldermen. The names of Honorary Aldermen are inscribed on a roll of honour board. This is situated on the ground floor of the Wolverhampton Civic Centre.

Former Councillor Hodson, January 1999
Former Councillor Howells, January 1999
Councillor D Seiboth, October 2000
Councillor N. G. Davies, September 2002
Councillor Carpenter, September 2002
Councillor A. Hart, December 2007
Councillor R. Hart, December 2008
Councillor T. Bowen, November 2009
Former Councillor Surjan Singh Duhra, July 2011
Former Councillor Paddy Bradley, September 2012
Former Councillor John Davis, September 2012

Police

The main police station for Wolverhampton is based on Bilston Street in the city centre. Wolverhampton Borough Police became part of West Midlands Constabulary in 1966. Policing is currently delivered by West Midlands Police.

List of Freemen of the City of Wolverhampton
Below is a list of people granted the title 'Freeman of Wolverhampton':

Right Honourable Henry Hartley Fowler, MP, 11 February 1892
Right Honourable Charles Pelham Villiers MP, 11 May 1897
Sir Charles Tertius Mander,  24 May 1897
Sir Joseph Cockfield Dimsdale, MP, 29 July 1902
Sir Alfred Hickman, MP, 29 July 1902
Alderman William Highfield Jones, 29 July 1902
Sir George Hayter Chubb, 14 October 1909
Alderman John Marston, 14 October 1909
Alderman Joseph Jones, 14 August 1912
Right Honourable David Lloyd George MP, 23 November 1918
Field Marshal Earl Haig of Bemersyde, 16 October 1919
Alderman Albert Baldwin Bantock, 9 November 1926
Alderman Levi Johnson, 9 November 1926
Alderman Thomas William Dickinson, 18 July 1938
Alderman Thomas Austin Henn, 7 October 1943
Alderman Alan Davies, 29 October 1945
Sir Charles Arthur Mander, 29 October 1945
Joseph Harold Sheldon (1920–1964), 24 March 1958. Pediatrician, see Freeman–Sheldon syndrome
Sir Charles Wheeler, 24 March 1958
Denise Lewis, 13 December 2000
Sir Jack Hayward, 9 July 2003
Veterans of the Princess Irene Brigade who were members of the Dutch Army stationed at Wrottesley Park during World War II, 19 August 2006
Dennis Turner, Baron Bilston, The Lord Bilston, 20 December 2006
Hugh Porter, 17 December 2008
Rachael Heyhoe Flint, Baroness Heyhoe Flint,  DL, 3 November 2010
Beverley Knight, 16 May 2018
Steve Bull, 11 September 2018

Demography

The 2021 Census gives the Wolverhampton Urban Subdivision as the second largest in the West Midlands conurbation. The figure given for Wolverhampton is 263,727. The proportion of females within the city (50.9%) is slightly higher than that of males (49.1%).
 
Wolverhampton has an ethnically diverse population; 60.6% of the city's population were white in the 2021 census, 21.2% were Asian, 9.3% were Black, 5.3% were mixed, and 3.6 were from another ethnic group. 

Based upon the 2021 census, Wolverhampton has a Christian population of 43.8%. The proportion of Wolverhampton residents professing no religion was 27.8%. Of religious groupings, Sikhism has the second largest following in Wolverhampton, accounting for 12% of the population in 2021, increased from 9.1% in the 2011 census, meaning the city has the largest percentage of Sikhs in England and Wales, and the third largest community numerically. The proportion of people following Islam was 5.5%, whilst Hinduism was followed by 3.7%, the figure for Buddhism was 0.3%. 

Wolverhampton is within the top 11% of local council areas in England and Wales (excluding London Boroughs) for public transport use for travelling to work at 16% of the total. 63% used private transport, either as a driver or passenger, 13% cycled or travelled on foot, whilst 8% worked from home.

Car ownership is lower than the average for England and Wales with 35.2% of households not owning a car, compared with 26.8% nationally. Single car ownership is in line with national averages (Wolverhampton 42.9%, England and Wales 43.8%), while the proportion of households owning more than one car is lower than the national average.

As of the 2021 United Kingdom census, with Wolverhampton's high British Asian population, the British Muslim, British Hindus and Sikh communities are more numerous than the national average.

Population change
The tables below detail the population change since 1750, separating that of the city itself and the geographical area now administered by Wolverhampton City Council.

Ethnicity of the borough

Religion

Economy

Traditionally, Wolverhampton's economy has been dominated by iron, steel, automobiles, engineering and manufacturing industries. Many of the traditional industries in the city have closed or dramatically downsized over the years. However, by 2008 the economy was dominated by the service sector, with 74.9% of the city's employment being in this area. The major subcomponents of this sector are in public administration, education and health (32.8% of the total employment), while distribution, hotels and restaurants take up 21.1%, and finance and IT takes up 12.7%. The largest non-service industry was that of manufacturing (12.9%), whilst 5.2% of the total employment is related to the tourism industry.

The largest single employer within the city is Wolverhampton City Council. which has over 12,000 staff Other large employers within the city include:
 Banking: Birmingham Midshires (Headquarters)
 Building materials: Tarmac and Carvers Builders Merchant
 Education: University of Wolverhampton and City of Wolverhampton College
 Construction: Carillion (Headquarters). Entered liquidation January 2018.
 Brewing: Marston's (Headquarters)
 Aerospace: H S Marston, MOOG and Goodrich Actuation Systems
 Retail: Beatties (now owned by House of Fraser) (due to close 2019)
 Manufacturing: Chubb Locks, Jaguar Land Rover (Engine Assembly Plant)
 National Health Service (NHS): New Cross Hospital

Jaguar Land Rover

In 2014 Jaguar Land Rover opened a £500 million Engine Assembly Plant at the i54 business park, Wolverhampton. Unveiled by Her Majesty, the plant produces 2.0-litre 4-cylinder Ingenium diesel and petrol engines. Having already been expanded once before, in 2015 it was announced that the factory would be doubling in size to 200,000 sq m (2,152,782 sq ft), costing $450 million. This expansion would see the workforce double from 700 to 1,400.

Goodyear

Goodyear opened a large factory on Stafford Road, Fordhouses, in 1927. However, it was decided in December 2003 that tyre production at the plant would be discontinued with the loss of more than 400 jobs. This came after some 2,000 job losses at the plant since 1997. The end of production came in 2004 but the factory remained open for tyre moulding and tractor tyre production.

Wolverhampton Wanderers

The varied success of Wolverhampton Wanderers since the club's formation in 1877 has also contributed to the economy of Wolverhampton. The club's greatest successes came between 1949 and 1960, when it won the league title three times and the FA Cup twice, as well as hosting a series of high-profile friendly matches against Europe's leading club sides, also competing in two early editions of the European Cup. During this era, Wolves frequently attracted crowds of between 40,000 and 50,000. Wolves went on to win the Football League Cup in 1974 and again in 1980, spending all but three seasons outside the top division of English football during the first 35 years of postwar league football, and continued to attract strong crowds but the 1980s saw a sharp decline in the club's fortunes, with three consecutive relegations, a sharp fall in attendances, and debts of more than £2million which almost put the club out of business. This decline also came at a time when the economy of Wolverhampton was struggling due to the early 1980s recession. Wolves enjoyed a surge in the late 1980s with two consecutive promotions, thanks largely to the prolific scoring of striker Steve Bull, and an upturn in attendances which also provided a boost to the local economy – as did the club's increased support during the 1990s, during which time the stadium was extensively rebuilt and its facilities improved, with its new features including a restaurant and office space. In 2018, Wolves won promotion to the FA Premier League for the third time in 15 years, and a year later reached its first FA Cup semi-final since 1998, and further redevelopment of the stadium is planned.

The Ministry of Housing, Communities and Local Government 

On 20 February 2021, it was announced as part of the government's levelling up strategy that The Ministry of Housing, Communities and Local Government (MHCLG), would be the first government department to have headquarters outside of London. It is expected that 500 posts including Senior Civil Servants would relocate to Wolverhampton by 2025.

Tallest buildings

Regeneration
In recent years, Wolverhampton City Council have embarked on many city improvements and regeneration schemes. One such project was "Summer Row", a new £300 million retail quarter for Wolverhampton city centre. The project would have involved clearing existing buildings, and in 2006 a compulsory purchase order was issued to over 200 owner / occupiers in the surrounding area. Construction of Summer Row was originally earmarked for 2008, with a completion date listed as 2010, but the 2008 recession put the project on hold.
In January 2011, the Summer Row project was formally cancelled as the CPO expired before the council found the necessary financial backing for the project.

Mander Centre Redevelopment

Debenhams, who were listed as the anchor store of Summer Row, announced they were still keen in opening a department store in Wolverhampton. It was revealed they would open an anchor store in a £35 million redevelopment of the Mander Centre. To be completed in 2017, the 90,000 sq.ft store would create 120 jobs. The redevelopment would also see the Mander Centre be fully refurbished and reconfigured. A number of larger stores would be created, replacing smaller ones. The reconfiguration saw the relocation of the toilets, escalators and elevators. The lower Central arcade was removed and Tesco and TJ Hughes were demolished to make way for 3-storey Debenhams store. Debenhams closed in January 2020. In 2019 Wilkinson relocated into the Mander Centre, closing a smaller store in Snow Hill.  B & M Stores opened in part of the former BHS store at the same time.

Wolverhampton Interchange Project

Wolverhampton's Interchange Project is a major redevelopment of the city's east side area worth around £120 million.

 Phase 1, which was completed in 2012, consisted of demolishing the old bus station and replacing it with a new £22.5 million station. This phase also included a new footbridge across the ring road towards the railway station, highway and pedestrian works, new offices for Centro and a Sainsbury's convenience store.
 Phase 2 which was completed in late 2015, involved the construction of the £10.6 million i10 building adjacent to the new bus station. The building contains 12,400 sq.ft of leisure and retail space on the ground floor and 36,000 sq.ft of office space above.
 Phase 3 began in early 2016 on expanding the train station's multi-storey car park. Completed in December 2016, the car park increased in capacity from 450 to over 800 spaces. The expansion of the multi-storey car park will include a new cycle and motorcycle parking, short stay parking, passenger drop off point and a taxi rank adjacent to the car park. A new entrance will be created.
 Phase 4 involved construction of a new development on the opposite side of Railway Drive to the i10 and is known as i9. The offices are used by the Department for Levelling Up, part of the National Government.

Transport

Road
Wolverhampton city centre forms the main focal point for the road network within the northwestern part of the West Midlands conurbation, and out into the rural hinterland of Staffordshire and Shropshire.  The road network within the boundaries of the city council area is entirely maintained by Wolverhampton City Council, whilst those parts of the urban area outside the city council area have their networks maintained by Staffordshire County Council, with the exception of M54 and A449 on the northern fringes of the urban area which are maintained by the Highways Agency.

Major historical improvements to the city's road network include Thomas Telford's Holyhead Road (now part of A41), which was constructed between 1819 and 1826 to improve communications between London and Holyhead, and hence to Ireland.  The majority of work within the city saw improvement to the contemporary network, though both the Wellington Road in Bilston and the cutting at the Rock near Tettenhall were newly constructed for the road, although the improvements at The Rock were constructed by the local Turnpike Trust rather than Telford himself. In 1927, the A4123 Birmingham-Wolverhampton New Road was constructed as both an unemployment relief project, and to relieve pressure on Telford's road through the Black Country. It was the first purpose built inter-city road in the United Kingdom within the 20th century, and was said to be the longest stretch of new road in Britain since the Romans. It took just three years to complete and cost £600,000. Also in 1927, the first automatic traffic lights in the United Kingdom were installed in Princes Square in the city centre. Princes Square was also the location of the United Kingdom's first pedestrian safety barriers, which were erected in 1934.

In 1960, plans were announced to build a Ring Road around the centre of Wolverhampton. By the end of the 1960s, more than half of the Ring Road had been completed, stretching from Snow Hill to Stafford Street (via Penn Road, Chapel Ash and Waterloo Road), followed a few years later by a section between Snow Hill and Bilston Street. However, the final section between Bilston Street and Stafford Street (via Wednesfield Road) was not completed until 1986.  An outer ring road was also planned but only a small section was ever built, this being Wobaston Road in Pendeford. 

Wolverhampton is near to several motorways, with four being located within  of the city centre.  The first to be constructed in the area was the M6, which opened in sections between 1966 and 1970, and connects the city with the north-west of England (including Manchester and Liverpool), Scotland as well as Birmingham and Coventry to the east, and London via the M1.  Together with the M5, which opened in the area in 1970 and links the city with the south-west of England, and London via the M40, the two motorways form a north–south bypass for the city.

The section of M6 motorway nearest to the city is one of the busiest within the UK, and to relieve congestion on this stretch, the M6 Toll which bypasses both the Wolverhampton and Birmingham sections of the M6 motorway was opened in 2003.

The M54 motorway forms a northern bypass to the city, passing just within the fringes of the urban area, and links the city with Telford, Shrewsbury and Wales.  It opened in 1983.

In addition to the motorways presently constructed, there have also been several proposed near to the city that have not been constructed, or have been constructed to a lower standard.  Included within these are the Bilston Link Motorway, which was first proposed in the 1960s and was eventually constructed to a lower standard in the 1980s as the A454/A463 Black Country Route; and the Western Orbital or Wolverhampton Western Bypass, which was first proposed in the 1970s as a bypass for the western side of the city and the wider West Midlands conurbation. Currently proposed by the Highways Agency is the M54 to M6 / M6 (Toll) Link Road. The route was initially proposed in the 2000s to relieve the overloaded sections of A460 and A449 near the city, and to replace a section of the cancelled Western Orbital.  Whilst it appears in the current roads programme, a date for the start of construction has not been set.

Rail
Wolverhampton is well connected by rail to other parts of England and Wales. However, while Priestfield and Bilston are connected by a tram line, the suburbs in the south, west and north of Wolverhampton are no longer served by rail - in particular the Tettenhall, Penn and Compton areas and Dunstall Park for the race course.

Wolverhampton's first railway opened in 1837, with the opening of the Grand Junction Railway, the first long-distance line in Great Britain.  The main station for the city was, however, not located in the city centre but at Wednesfield Heath, now Heath Town on the east side of the city. This station was considered to be a First Class station, though its location was obviously not ideal and it became a goods station after passenger services ceased in 1873.  The station buildings were demolished in 1965, but the main station area is now a nature reserve just off Powell Street, called Station Fields and part of the edge of the northbound platform is still in situ. The track running through the station site is, however, still in use.

The first station in the city centre was opened by the Shrewsbury and Birmingham Railway in 1849.  This station was only intended to be temporary and was located on the north side of Wednesfield Road, beside Broad Street Basin.  The station was constructed as the opening of Wolverhampton High Level was delayed.  The station closed in 1852 and was demolished in the mid-1970s. In addition to the temporary station, Wolverhampton railway works were also established in 1849 by the Shrewsbury and Birmingham Railway and became the Northern Division workshop of the Great Western Railway in 1854.

The permanent station on the line finally opened on 24 June 1852 and was initially known as Wolverhampton General; it was renamed as Wolverhampton Queen Street in 1853 and finally Wolverhampton High Level in 1855.  The station was initially a joint station between the Shrewsbury and Birmingham Railway and the London and North Western Railway, though there were problems in the relationships between the two companies; the station became solely LNWR in 1854, before the Wolverhampton and Walsall Railway (later part of the Midland Railway) gained access to the station in 1867.  The original High Level station was demolished in 1965, as part of the electification of the West Coast Main Line and was replaced by the buildings on the present site but which are in the process of being demolished.

Two years after the opening of the High Level station, the Oxford, Worcester and Wolverhampton Railway (OWW) opened their city centre station immediately to the east of High Level.  Initially called Wolverhampton Joint, it was renamed Wolverhampton Low Level in 1856. As well as the OWW, the station also served the Birmingham, Wolverhampton and Dudley Railway and the Shrewsbury and Birmingham Railway.  As the first two companies were supported by the Great Western Railway, broad gauge track was laid to the station, meaning that Wolverhampton Low Level became the most northerly station on the broad gauge network before being converted to standard gauge in 1869.  Despite being featured in the second Beeching Report, The Development of the Major Railway Trunk Routes in February 1965 as being on a line earmarked for further investment, services were withdrawn progressively from Low Level starting in 1967, soon after it had been transferred administratively from the Western Region of British Railways to the London Midland region.  London services were transferred to the newly electrified High Level station.  Low Level was converted into a Parcels Concentration Depot in 1970 and the final passenger services were withdrawn in 1972. These services (to and from Birmingham Snow Hill) were only suspended and never legally withdrawn by British Rail and so technically the station is still open.

There were also a number of suburban stations in Wolverhampton – including Dunstall Park and Bushbury north of the city centre; Tettenhall and Compton to the west side of the city on the GWR's Wombourne Branch Line; Wednesfield and Heath Town on the Wolverhampton and Walsall Railway; Portobello on the Walsall to Wolverhampton Line; Priestfield and Bilston Central on the Birmingham Snow Hill to Wolverhampton Low Level Line; and Bilston West and Daisy Bank on the Oxford-Worcester-Wolverhampton Line.  Today, all of the suburban rail stations within the city have been closed, although Coseley, Codsall and Bilbrook are just outside the boundaries. Also, some of the seven West Midlands Metro tram stations in the city are near or directly replace these former suburban stations.

The former High Level station, now simply known as Wolverhampton station, is today one of the principal stations on the West Coast Main Line. It has regular rail services to London Euston, Birmingham New Street and Manchester Piccadilly, as well as most other major cities in the UK. In addition to the long-distance services, there are many local services including those on the Cambrian Line into Wales, the Walsall to Wolverhampton Line to Walsall, the Wolverhampton to Shrewsbury Line to Telford and Shrewsbury; and the Rugby-Birmingham-Stafford Line to Stafford and Coventry.

The 1960s buildings of the station have now been demolished, following a lengthy delay, and are being replaced with a more modern station building.  Phase 1 opened in Spring 2020, which saw the creation of a new entrance.  Phase 2 saw the demolition of the remainder but construction of the replacement was delayed due to the COVID-19 restrictions. This new station includes a stop on the Metro tram line which should also open in September 2021.

Buses

Buses in the city are run commercially by a number of bus operators, the largest provider of services is National Express West Midlands. As well as serving suburbs of the city, buses from the centre of Wolverhampton also provide a direct link with the city of Birmingham and connections to Walsall, Telford, West Bromwich, Stourbridge, Cannock, Stafford, Sedgley, Bilston, Bloxwich, Bridgnorth and Dudley.

Wolverhampton bus station operated by Transport for West Midlands is situated at Pipers Row, near to the railway station, providing an interchange between the two modes of transport. The station has recently had a complete rebuild. Its previous Pipers Row incarnation opened on 26 October 1986, just six years after its predecessor of 1981. The station underwent a further upgrade in 1990, which saw the grade II listed Queen's Building incorporated into the bus station. A mild refurbishment took place in 2005/06, with new toilets and the addition of a coach stand.

In July 2009, plans were unveiled for a complete rebuild of the bus station, which was part of Wolverhampton's Interchange Project. The bus station closed in April 2010 and was demolished; a £22.5 million station opened in July 2011.

Bilston bus station is a small bus interchange located in Bilston Town Centre, Wolverhampton. It opened in 1991, as a new bus station to serve the town of Bilston and became an interchange on 31 May 1999 when the Midland Metro service opened on the adjacent railway line that had been disused since the end of 1982.

Bus services are operated mostly by National Express West Midlands and Diamond Bus and most serve the station which is a short, walkable distance from Bilston Central tram stop, which links the town to Birmingham, West Bromwich, Wednesbury and Wolverhampton. National Express West Midlands service 79 (Wolverhampton - West Bromwich via Darlaston and Wednesbury) operates along the main A41 through the town, omitting the bus station.

The station is built around a large square building which features a shop.

West Midlands Metro

The West Midlands Metro, a light rail system, currently connects Wolverhampton St George's to Grand Central tram stop via West Bromwich and Wednesbury, mostly following the former Birmingham Snow Hill-Wolverhampton Low Level Line. There were plans for further lines within the city, with both a city centre loop and a line to Walsall via Wednesfield and Willenhall, mostly following the route of the closed Wolverhampton and Walsall Railway, however, these were cancelled in late 2015.

All of the seven westernmost stations on the network are in Wolverhampton, with this number increasing to nine once Pipers Row and Wolverhampton station are connected to the network.

In 2014/15, Centro announced in a £40 million deal, they would be replacing the entire fleet of the 16 AnsaldoBreda T-69 trams with 21 CAF Urbos 3 trams. The new Urbos 3 trams are 9 metres longer; at 33 metres, with the ability of carrying 210 passengers, compared to the 156 from the T69. Additionally with the upgraded trams, Wolverhampton's Metro Line will be expanded. As part of the Wolverhampton Interchange Project; the Metro line will be extended from Wolverhampton St George's to Wolverhampton railway station, creating one stop at Wolverhampton bus station and subsequently ending at the railway station. It was scheduled to open in September 2020. However delays caused by COVID-19 mean the extension is not expected to open until September 2021.

In 2021, construction started on a 2 new metro Lines from Brierley Hill to Wolverhampton and Birmingham, one of these lines will terminate in Wolverhampton City Centre and will boost connectivity to the Black Country, this means that the corridor between Wolverhampton and Wednesbury will be served every 3 minutes by trams in peak times.

In late September 2021, funding was given for over 4 new metro projects, including a new line from Walsall to New Cross Hospital. This new line will extend the existing line from Wolverhampton Interchange to the hospital, via an old railway line. Another planned but not confirmed extension is from St Georges to the i54.

Air
Wolverhampton's original airport was at Pendeford, opened in 1938 and closed on 31 December 1970. Expansion of the airport has been suggested, but the current owners want to keep it as a General Aviation airfield. The airport hosts various "fly in" events and is an original World War Two airfield.

The airport is easy to reach by train, with a direct express service to it only taking on average 36 minutes. By car, it takes approximately 45 minutes via the M6 or M6 Toll Road. There are direct flights to Amritsar, Delhi, Dubai, Orlando, Dublin, Paris, Bucharest, Frankfurt and Munich

Waterways

The Birmingham Canal Main Line passes through the city centre, connecting with the remaining portion of the Wednesbury Oak Loop at Deepfields Junction, and the Wyrley & Essington Canal at Horseley Fields Junction, before passing between the railway station and the bus station in the city centre and then descending 132 feet (40m) through the 21 Wolverhampton Locks and terminating at Aldersley Junction where it meets the Staffordshire and Worcestershire Canal, which in turn connects with the Shropshire Union Canal at Autherley Junction.

Cycling
Most places in the borough and some of the neighbouring villages in South Staffordshire are within easy reach of the city centre by pedal cycle and terrain is moderately hilly. Climbs tend to be of two to three minutes duration. Cycling benefits from the  city centre within the Ring Road and a number of routes that use quieter roads and paths to avoid the ten 'A' roads that radiate from the Ring Road. Wolverhampton is on the Smethwick to Telford section of Sustrans National Cycle Network Route 81. This follows the Birmingham Main Line Canal towpath from Smethwick to Broad Street Basin, Wolverhampton where the route splits in two. The choice here is between riding the 21 locks section of the Birmingham Main Line Canal to Aldersley Junction or taking the Cross-City route braid to visit the city centre, West Park or Smestow Valley Leisure Ride before returning to Aldersley Junction. NCN81 continues to Autherley Junction along the towpath of the Staffordshire and Worcestershire Canal and then along the east bank towpath of the Shropshire Union Canal as far as Pendeford Mill Lane before turning to Bilbrook in Staffordshire. The lanes of nearby South Staffordshire and east Shropshire provide ideal cycle touring conditions.

Culture

Music

The rock groups Slade, Sahotas, Cornershop, The Mighty Lemon Drops and Babylon Zoo came from Wolverhampton, as do electronic musician Bibio, soul/R&B singer Beverley Knight, drum and bass guru Goldie, roots reggae maestro Macka B. Kevin Rowland of Dexys Midnight Runners was born in Wednesfield, Wolverhampton.

Hip Hop music producer S-X who has worked with T.I., J. Cole, Birdman & Lil Wayne was born and raised and still lives in Wolverhampton. In 2010, Wolverhampton-born singer Liam Payne came third in the British television music show The X Factor with his boy band One Direction, who in March 2012 became the first British group to go straight to the top of the US music charts with their debut album, Up All Night.

Wolverhampton has a number of live music venues; the largest occasionally used being the football ground, Molineux Stadium, which was used for a Bon Jovi concert in 2003, but the biggest indoor venue regularly used is Wolverhampton Civic Hall, with a standing capacity of 3,000. Second to that is Wulfrun Hall (part of the same complex as the Civic Hall, which is owned and operated by the City Council) which has a standing capacity of just over 1,100. The Civic Halls complex also has a newer venue, The Slade Rooms (named after the 1970s rock band), which has a capacity of approximately 550 standing. There are also a number of smaller venues with capacities of between 100 and 250, although the longest-established of these, the Wolverhampton Varsity, is now closed, as is the Little Civic. Other venues include the Light Bar in Fryer Street, the 'Numa Bar' and the Dog & Doublet (next to the old Little Civic), although the situation in this area of entertainment remains fluid. The 18th-century St John's Church is a venue for smaller scale classical concerts. The city is also home to Regent Records, a choral and organ music recording company, and Wolf Town DIY, an independent record label that primarily releases punk and alternative music by underground artists. The Midland Box Office is the primary sales point for most of Wolverhampton's venues and is situated in Queen Square.

The city's main choral groups include the City of Wolverhampton Choir, (a choral society founded as the Wolverhampton Civic Choir in 1947) and the Choir of St. Peter's Collegiate Church.

Arts and museums
The Grand Theatre on Lichfield Street is Wolverhampton's largest theatre, opening on 10 December 1894. It was designed by C. J. Phipps and completed within six months. Included amongst the people to have appeared at the theatre are Henry Irving, Charlie Chaplin and Sean Connery. It was also used by politicians including Winston Churchill and David Lloyd George. The theatre was closed between 1980 and 1982.

The Arena Theatre on Wulfruna Street, within the University of Wolverhampton is the secondary theatre, seating 150. It hosts both professional and amateur performances.

Cinema is catered for by a multiplex Cineworld located at Bentley Bridge, Wednesfield, and a smaller cinema, Light House Media Centre, housed in the former Chubb Buildings on Fryer Street. Cineworld mainly shows Hollywood films, other big-budget films, and some Bollywood films, whilst Light House shows a range of older and subtitled films as well as some selected new releases. Light House has also played host to visual art shows, an International Animation Festival and incorporates a small café. The Lighthouse closed its doors for the final time on 3rd November 2022.

The city's Arts & Museums service, run by the council, covers three sites: Wolverhampton Art Gallery, home to England's biggest Pop art collection after that held at the Tate; Bantock House, a fine historic house with Edwardian interior with a museum of Wolverhampton located within Bantock Park; Bilston Craft Gallery with exhibitions of contemporary crafts.

The Black Country Living Museum, situated in nearby Dudley, has a large collection of artefacts and buildings from across the Black Country, including an extensive collection associated with the city.

Eagle Works Studios and Gallery situated in Chapel Ash, is a self run artists' group.  It provides studio accommodation for eighteen visual artists, mostly painters.  Its small gallery holds a regular programme of exhibitions to show and promote contemporary art in the city.

The National Trust owns two properties on the edge of the city that are open to the public: Wightwick Manor, which is a Victorian manor house and one of only a few surviving examples of a house built and furnished under the influence of the Arts and Crafts movement, and Moseley Old Hall, which is famous as one of the resting places of Charles II of England during his escape to France following defeat at the Battle of Worcester in 1651. English Heritage owns Boscobel House, within Shropshire, another refuge of Charles II.

Nearby museums also include the Royal Air Force Museum, at RAF Cosford and the RAF Fire Service Museum at Wolverhampton Airport., whilst Chillington Hall, which boasts of grounds designed by Capability Brown, and Himley Hall are nearby examples of houses open to the public.

Libraries

Located on the corner of Garrick Street and St George's Parade, Wolverhampton Central Library is a Grade II listed building, designed by architect Henry T. Hare and opened in 1902. It was originally commissioned to commemorate Queen Victoria's Diamond Jubilee using funds raised by the Mayor, Alderman S Craddock, and by a grant of £1,000 from Andrew Carnegie. This new library improved public access to information and reading material, replacing its cramped predecessor in the old Garrick Street Police Station.

The terracotta exterior has a tripartite theme of related, but distinct façades. The entrance façade is the architect's centrepiece and is decorated with a frieze under the triple window which carries the Royal Coat of Arms and the Wolverhampton Coat of Arms. The other two façades celebrate English literary giants; Chaucer, Dryden, Pope, Shelley, Byron and Spenser on one side and Milton and Shakespeare on the other. An extension for a newsroom and a students' room was added in 1936 followed by a small brick and concrete extension at the rear in the 1970s.

Wolverhampton City Council also operate 14 branch libraries within the city.

Media
Wolverhampton is home to the Express & Star newspaper, which boasts of having the largest circulation of any provincial daily evening newspaper in the UK. Parent company Midland News Association is based in Wolverhampton.

The city was originally home to four radio stations, 107.7 The Wolf which was absorbed into regional station Signal 107, now broadcasting as Greatest Hits Radio Black Country & Shropshire from studios in Liverpool, Manchester, London and Birmingham, Beacon Radio absorbed by Orion Media and now laterly Bauer Media broadcasting as Free Radio Black Country & Shropshire from studios in Birmingham and Manchester. The third was Radio WABC, the AM service from Beacon Radio that has since closed following a number of rebrands as Classic Gold Digital, Capital Gold and Free Radio 80s. The fourth, and now the only radio station based in the city, is community radio station WCR FM which broadcasts solely to the Wolverhampton on 101.8FM, online, via the Tune In app and via smart speaker.

In December 2005, the BBC commissioned the poet Ian McMillan to write a poem about Wolverhampton, along with four other towns which apparently "had a reputation they didn't deserve".

Education

The University of Wolverhampton is the main provider of higher education in the city. The university currently has more than 23,000 students. In 1835, the Wolverhampton Mechanics' Institute was founded, and its lineage can be traced via the Wolverhampton and Staffordshire Technical College (1935), to The Polytechnic, Wolverhampton (1969) to today's University of Wolverhampton, given university status in 1992.  The main university campus is in the city centre, with other campuses at Compton, and in the nearby towns of Walsall and Telford.

Wolverhampton Grammar School was founded in 1512, making it one of the oldest active schools in the UK. Old boys include Mervyn King, Governor of the Bank of England between July 2003 and 2013, and Sir David Wright, former British Ambassador to Japan.

Other notably historic schools include The Royal School, Wolverhampton (founded in 1850), and Tettenhall College (1863), which educated the winner of Nobel Prize for Chemistry, Professor Sir Arthur Harden. City of Wolverhampton College is the main further education college in the city.

Wolverhampton Girls' High School is a well known selective school which has produced top of league table results within Wolverhampton. Notable old girls include the former English women's cricket captain Rachael Heyhoe-Flint and Baroness Hayman, first Lord Speaker of the House of Lords, as well as Georgia Elwiss, a member of the current 2015 women's cricket team.

St Peter's Collegiate School was founded in 1847 in buildings adjacent to St Peter's Collegiate Church in Wolverhampton town centre. It moved to the present extensive green site at Compton Park in 1965. St Peter's is the oldest established educational institution currently in the state sector in Wolverhampton, with a tradition of academic, cultural and sporting excellence nourished by Christian spiritual and moral values. Previous students include record-breaking goalscoring footballer Arthur Rowley and Ben Godfrey, a TV presenter, and reporter on Midlands Today.

Wolverhampton, unlike a number of nearby areas such as Dudley and South Staffordshire, has always had traditional age range schools; 5–7 infants, 7–11 juniors and 11-16/18 secondary schools. Some secondary schools have sixth form facilities for children aged 16+.

Sport

Football
Wolverhampton is represented in the Premier League, the highest tier of English football, by Wolverhampton Wanderers FC. 'Wolves', as they are known, are one of the oldest English football clubs, and were one of the 12 founder members of the Football League. Their most successful period was the 1950s, where they won three Football League Championships (then the highest division) and two FA Cups, and were involved in the earliest European friendlies. They were hailed by the press as 'The Unofficial World Champions' after one of their most famous victories, against Budapest Honvéd FC of Hungary. They were also the first English team to play in the Soviet Union. These victories instigated the birth of the European Cup competition which later evolved into the UEFA Champions' League (see European Cup and Champions League history).

In total, they have won three Football League titles (prior to the top division becoming the Premier League), four FA Cups, have two League Cup victories and many other minor honours, including reaching the UEFA Cup Final in 1972, and appearances in the last eight of both the UEFA European Cup, and the European Cup Winners' Cup, but spent just one season in the top division between 1984 and 2009.  They are also one of only two clubs, along with Portsmouth, to have won five different league titles; they have championed all four tiers of the professional English league, as well as the long-defunct northern section of the Third Division.

Wolves have a long-established rivalry with West Bromwich Albion. Aston Villa and Birmingham City FC are also close rivals of Wolves, having played them 121 and 136 times respectively. Geographically, Walsall FC are closest to Wolves, but rarely compete at the same level. Since 1886, the two clubs have only played 16 times against each other.

Several other Wolverhampton-based clubs play non-league football, notably AFC Wulfrunians and Wolverhampton Sporting Community F.C. in the Midland Football League Premier Division, Wolverhampton Casuals FC, Wednesfield FC, and Bilston Town FC in the West Midlands (Regional) League, and Warstones Wanderers F.C. in the West Midlands (Regional) League – Division Two.

Athletics
Wolverhampton's Aldersley Leisure Village is also home to Wolverhampton & Bilston Athletics Club, which was formed in 1967 with a merger between Wolverhampton Harriers and Bilston Town Athletic Club. They have won the National League Division One for men from 1975 to 1982, and the Men's National Cup finals in 1976, 1977, 1979 and 1980. It also represented Britain in the European Clubs Cup from 1976 to 1983 with the best finishing position of third.

Olympic Medallists in athletics Sonia Lannaman and Tessa Sanderson lived within the city.

Cycling
Wolverhampton Wheelers is the city's oldest cycling club (formed in 1891), and was home to Hugh Porter who won four world championship pursuit titles; and Percy Stallard who has been credited with bringing cycle road racing to Britain when he held the Llangollen to Wolverhampton race on 7 June 1942. Wolverhampton Wheelers make extensive use of the velodrome at Aldersley Stadium.  Wolverhampton was also the home of Trevor Gadd, who was a six time British National Cycle champion and two-time silver medallist at the 1978 Commonwealth Games, as well as a fifth-place finisher in the 1977 UCI Track Cycling World Championships in Venezuela.

Wolverhampton has also hosted the Tour of Britain, with a stage start in 2006, a stage finish in 2007 and a sprint finish in 2008.
It is also home to Wednesfield Aces cycle speedway who are based on Ashmore Park.

Horse and greyhound racing
Wolverhampton Racecourse is located at Dunstall Park, just to the north of the city centre. This was one of the first all-weather horse racing courses in the UK and is Britain's only floodlit horse race track. There is also greyhound racing at Monmore Green. West Park, a large park near the city centre, was converted from a racecourse.

A horse by the name of Wolverhampton was among the leading contenders for the 1849 Grand National at Aintree but did not complete the course.

Motor sports

Sunbeam built many early Grand Prix cars and was the only British make to win a Grand Prix in the first half of the 20th century.

AJS was heavily involved in motorcycle racing either side of World War II, which included winning the 1949 World Championship in the 500cc category.

Kieft Cars built Formula Three cars in the early 1950s. Their best known driver was Stirling Moss.

Wolverhampton Wolves, one of the leading speedway clubs in the UK represents the city, participating in the Elite League at the Monmore Green stadium. Wolverhampton Speedway is one of the oldest speedway tracks in the world that is still in operation being first used, albeit briefly in 1928. The track re-opened in 1950 for a single meeting and in 1952 the Wasps competed in the Third Division on the National League. The track closed early in 1954 and did not re-open until 1961 when the Wolves were introduced to the Provincial League. The track has almost been an ever-present ever since and currently operates in the British Elite League. Ole Olsen (in 1971 and 1975), Sam Ermolenko (in 1993) and Tai Woffinden (in 2013) were riders for the club when they became World Speedway Champions. The Wolves are defending Elite League champions, having defeated the Belle Vue Aces in the 2016 play-off final.

Le Mans 24 Hours winner Richard Attwood is from the city.

Marathon
Wolverhampton is home to the Carver Wolverhampton City Marathon. The marathon is part of a series of events whose main goal is to raise money for charity.

Obstacle course race 
The Tough Guy Race is held annually near Wolverhampton. The race is considered the first civilian obstacle course race.

Commonwealth Games
The City hosted the Cycling Time Trials for the 2022 Commonwealth Games on August 4th 2022. The start and finish was at West Park, with the route passing through the City Centre before heading out into city suburbs.

Places of interest

Notable people

There are a number of notable people who are associated with Wolverhampton.

Political figures associated with Wolverhampton include Enoch Powell MP, Sir Charles Pelham Villiers MP, who holds the record for the longest serving MP, Jane Stevenson MP, Helene Hayman, Baroness Hayman, who was the first Lord Speaker within the House of Lords, former Cabinet minister Stephen Byers, former Prime Minister of the United Kingdom Boris Johnson, who briefly worked as a writer for the Express & Star, Henry Fowler, 1st Viscount Wolverhampton, a solicitor and Liberal politician, David Wright, a former UK Ambassador to Japan, and Button Gwinnett, who was a signatory of the US Declaration of Independence and briefly served as Governor of Georgia.

There are many sportspeople associated with the city, with footballers such as Billy Wright, Steve Bull, Bert Williams and Jimmy Mullen; along with Percy Stallard and Hugh Porter within the world of cycling, the Olympic medallist swimmer Anita Lonsbrough, professional darts player Wayne Jones, racing driver and winner of the 24 hours of Le Mans Richard Attwood as well as athletes such as Tessa Sanderson and Denise Lewis and cricketer Vikram Solanki who grew up here and played for Wolverhampton Cricket Club before joining Worcestershire.

Entertainers include actors Nigel Bennett, Goldie, Frances Barber, Meera Syal and Eric Idle; and musicians Noddy Holder, Dave Hill, Beverley Knight, Dave Holland, Maggie Teyte, Edward Elgar, Mitch Harris, Robert Plant, Bibio, Paul Raven, trap-metal rapper Scarlxrd, and Liam Payne of the group One Direction; and television presenters Suzi Perry, Mark Rhodes and Mark Speight. The socially conservative future president of the National Viewers' and Listeners' Association, Mary Whitehouse, lived in Wolverhampton between 1939 and the early 1960s before relocating to Shropshire.

Within the area of commerce and industry, Sir Alfred Hickman (first Chairman of Tarmac), Sir Geoffrey Mander, John Marston founder of Sunbeam Cycles and Sunbeam Motor Car Company, John 'Iron Mad' Wilkinson (pioneer of Cast iron) and Mervyn King, the former Governor of the Bank of England, are amongst the most notable. Prof Ernest Geoffrey Cullwick, a specialist in electromagnetism and its effects on atomic particles, was born and raised in Wolverhampton. Thief-Taker General, Jonathan Wild (ca.1682–1725) came from the town.

See also
 1835 Wolverhampton riot
Wolverhampton power station

References

External links

 Wolverhampton Civic and Historical Society
 Wolverhampton City Council
 The Parish Of Central Wolverhampton
 The Archive of Hart Photography Ltd. Website – Images of Wolverhampton City Center under development during the 1960s
 

 
Towns in the West Midlands (county)
Cities in the West Midlands (region)
Metropolitan boroughs of the West Midlands (county)
NUTS 3 statistical regions of the United Kingdom
Populated places established in the 10th century
History of Staffordshire
985 establishments
Black Country Local Enterprise Partnership
10th-century establishments in England
Unparished areas in the West Midlands (county)